A Six Shootin' Romance is a 1926 American silent Western film directed by Clifford Smith and starring Jack Hoxie, Olive Hasbrouck and William Steele.

Plot 
"Lightning" Jack (Jack Hoxie) is joint heir to a ranch with eastern society girl Donaldeen Travis (Olive Hasbrouck).

Although neighboring rancher Currier King (William Steele) is already married, he is attracted to Donaldeen and begins to court her.  When Donaldeen learns Currier is married, she spurns his advances.  Angered, Currier abducts Donaldeen.

Jack rallies his men to rescue Donaldeen from Currier, and Donaldeen finds that she is in love with Jack.

Cast
 Jack Hoxie as "Lightning" Jack
 Olive Hasbrouck as Donaldeen Travis 
 William Steele as Currier King 
 Carmen Phillips as Mrs. King 
 Robert McKenzie as Ricketts
 Mattie Peters as Mammy 
 Virginia Bradford as Muriel Travis

Production 
A Six Shootin' Romance was one of several silent films of the 1920s to be shot in the Alabama Hills.

This was Carmen Phillips's final screen performance.

References

External links
 

1926 films
1926 Western (genre) films
American black-and-white films
Films directed by Clifford Smith
Silent American Western (genre) films
Universal Pictures films
1920s English-language films
1920s American films